Environmental Toxicology and Pharmacology is a bimonthly peer-reviewed scientific journal covering research on the toxicological and pharmacological effects of environmental contaminants. It is published by Elsevier and was established in 1992 as the Environmental Toxicology and Pharmacology Section of the European Journal of Pharmacology, obtaining its current name in February 1996, when it was founded by Jan H. Koeman (Agricultural University, Wageningen) and Nico. P. E. Vermeulen Vrije Universiteit Amsterdam. Vermeulen was editor-in-chief until 2017, when he retired and Michael D. Coleman (Aston University) took over. According to the Journal Citation Reports, the journal has a 2020 impact factor of 4.860  The journal is included in the Index Medicus and in MEDLINE.

References

External links

Toxicology journals
Environmental health journals
Publications established in 1992
Elsevier academic journals
Bimonthly journals
Pharmacology journals
English-language journals